Saint-Martin-des-Champs is the name of several communes in France, each named for Martin of Tours:

 Saint-Martin-des-Champs, Cher
 Saint-Martin-des-Champs, Finistère
 Saint-Martin-des-Champs, Manche
 Saint-Martin-des-Champs, Seine-et-Marne
 Saint-Martin-des-Champs, Yvelines
 Saint-Martin-des-Champs, Yonne

See also
 Saint-Martin-des-Champs Priory, a former monastery in Paris
 Saint-Martin-aux-Champs, a commune in the Marne département
 Saint Martin (disambiguation)
 St Martin-in-the-Fields (disambiguation)